Stephen B. Horsman is a Canadian politician, who was elected to the Legislative Assembly of New Brunswick in the 2014 provincial election. He represented the electoral district of Fredericton North as a member of the Liberal Party until his defeat in the 2020 New Brunswick general election.

When Gallant's government was formally sworn into office on October 7, 2014, Horsman was named to the Executive Council of New Brunswick as Minister of Public Safety and Justice and as deputy premier.

It was rumoured that the controversy over the government veto to the judicial appointment process was at the centre of the ministerial reshuffle of June 2016, which saw Stephen Horsman replaced by Denis Landry in the Justice portfolio. Horsman was tasked at this juncture with the families and children ministry.

References

Living people
New Brunswick Liberal Association MLAs
Politicians from Fredericton
Deputy premiers of New Brunswick
Members of the Executive Council of New Brunswick
21st-century Canadian politicians
Year of birth missing (living people)